Somerville Intermediate School is a decile 10 intermediate school mainly serving Howick, which is a suburb of Manukau City, New Zealand.

History 
With the large number of houses being built in the Somerville area, a new intermediate school was needed and so the building of Somerville Intermediate started in 1996. The school opened to students on 28 January 1997. The school opened with four houses Wiltshire, Sligo, Nicholas and Paparoa which are connected to the history of the Somerville area.

The school's first gymnasium opened on 6 August 2010 after 8 years of planning and $1.5 million in fundraising.

The school was one of the first in the Auckland area to debut Bring Your Own Device. The school uses Google Apps to manage student work and to use a digital portfolio.

References

External links

Intermediate schools in Auckland